Eleousa is a village in the municipal unit of Pasaronas, Ioannina regional unit, Greece. Since the 2010 local government reform, it is the seat of the municipality Zitsa. In 2011, its population was 3,484. It is situated in the valley northwest of Lake Ioannina, 7 km northwest of the city centre of Ioannina.

See also

List of settlements in the Ioannina regional unit

References

Populated places in Ioannina (regional unit)